Gymnastics was contested at the 1990 Asian Games, held in Beijing, China from September 23, 1990, to September 26, 1990. Only artistic events were contested.

Medalists

Men

Women

Medal table

References 

 New Straits Times, September 23–27, 1990

External links 
 Olympic Council of Asia

 
1990 Asian Games events
1990
Asian Games
1990 Asian Games